Jakubany (Jakubjanŷ, Yakubyany) is a village and municipality in Stará Ľubovňa District in the Prešov Region of northern Slovakia.

History
In historical records the village was first mentioned in 1322.

Geography
The municipality lies at an altitude of 610 metres and covers an area of 16.748 km². It has a population of about 2488 people.

Genealogical resources

The records for genealogical research are available at the state archive "Statny Archiv in Levoca, Slovakia"

 Roman Catholic church records (births/marriages/deaths): 1635-1920 (parish B)
 Greek Catholic church records (births/marriages/deaths): 1772-1918 (parish A)

See also
 List of municipalities and towns in Slovakia

External links
Jakubany - The Carpathian Connection
https://web.archive.org/web/20071027094149/http://www.statistics.sk/mosmis/eng/run.html
Surnames of living people in Jakubany

Villages and municipalities in Stará Ľubovňa District